Anti-sidereal time and extended-sidereal time are artificial time standards used to analyze the daily variation in the number of cosmic rays received on Earth. Anti-sidereal time has about 364.25 days per year, one day less than the number of days in a year of solar time, 365.25. Thus each anti-sidereal day is longer than a solar day (24 hr) by about four minutes or 24 hr 4 min. Extended-sidereal time has about 367.25 days per year, one day more than the number of days in a year of sidereal time, 366.25. Thus each extended-sidereal day is shorter than a sidereal day (23 hr 56 min) by about four minutes or 23 hr 52 min. All years mentioned have the same length.

Amplitude modulation sidebands
Cosmic rays received on Earth exhibit daily variations in amplitude in solar time due to the distribution of cosmic rays in the inner heliosphere and to the Compton-Getting effect caused by Earth's orbital velocity around the Sun. Other daily variations in amplitude in sidereal time are caused by the anisotropy in the direction from which cosmic rays are received relative to the plane of our galaxy, the Milky Way. Both are contaminated by an annual seasonal variation. The upper sideband of the solar frequency contaminates the amplitude of the sidereal frequency, while the lower sideband of the sidereal frequency contaminates the amplitude of the solar frequency.

See also
 Earth's rotation

References

Astroparticle physics
Cosmic rays
Time scales
Time in astronomy